Big Creek may refer to:

In Australia
 Big Creek, Tasmania, a tributary of the Inglis River in Tasmania, Australia

In Belize
 Big Creek, Belize, a sea port in Belize

In Canada
 Big Creek (British Columbia), a tributary of the Chilcotin River
 Big Creek Provincial Park, a British Columbia Provincial Park
 Big Creek, British Columbia, a locality and former post office in the Chilcotin District of British Columbia
 Big Creek (Lake Erie), empties into Lake Erie at Port Rowan

In the United States
Alphabetical by state
 Big Creek Lake, formed by damming the Big Creek in southwest Alabama
 Big Creek, California, an unincorporated town in Fresno County
 Big Creek (San Joaquin River), a tributary of the San Joaquin River in California
 Big Creek (Georgia), a tributary of the Chattahoochee River
 Big Creek, Idaho, an unincorporated community in Shoshone County
 Big Creek (Des Moines River), a main tributary of the Des Moines River in Iowa
 Big Creek (Kansas), a tributary of the Smoky Hill River
 Big Creek (Kentucky), a tributary of the Tug Fork of the Big Sandy River
 Big Creek (Union Parish, LA), a creek near Marion, Louisiana
 Big Creek (Marshyhope Creek tributary), a stream in Dorchester County, Maryland
 Big Creek, Mississippi, a village in Calhoun County
 Big Creek, Missouri, an unincorporated community 
 Big Creek (Castor River tributary), a stream in Missouri
 Big Creek (Cuivre River tributary), a stream in Missouri
 Big Creek (Current River tributary), a stream in Texas and western Shannon counties of Missouri
 Big Creek (Current River East), a stream in Dent, Reynolds and northeast Shannon counties of Missouri
 Big Creek (South Grand River tributary), a stream in Missouri
 Big Creek (Salt River tributary), a stream in Missouri
 Big Creek (St. Francis River), a stream in Missouri
 Big Creek (Northwest Missouri), a stream in Missouri
 Big Creek (Oriskany Creek tributary), a stream in Oneida County, New York
 Big Creek (Cuyahoga River), a tributary of the Cuyahoga River in Northeast Ohio
 Big Creek (Geauga County, Ohio), a stream in Northeast Ohio
 Big Creek (Lane County, Oregon), a stream flowing directly into the Pacific Ocean
 Big Creek Bridge (Oregon)
 Big Creek (Beech River tributary), a stream in Tennessee
 Big Creek (Trinity River), a tributary of the Trinity River (Texas)
 Big Creek High School, in War, West Virginia
 Big Creek (Wisconsin), a stream in Sauk County

See also
Big Creek Township (disambiguation)